A tribunal is a generic term for any body acting judicially.

Tribunal or The Tribunal may also refer to:

Places
 Tribunal (Madrid Metro), a railway station in Madrid, Spain
 The Tribunal, Glastonbury, a historic building in Somerset, England

Television 
 Tribunal (TV series), a 1963–1964 Australian historical drama anthology series
 "Tribunal" (Grimm), an episode
 "Tribunal" (The Outer Limits), an episode
 "Tribunal" (Star Trek: Deep Space Nine), an episode
Animated Alias: Tribunal, a 2003 American animated short film produced for the DVD release of the third season of Alias
 The Tribunal (Metalocalypse), a fictional organization in the TV series Metalocalypse

Other uses 
 Tribunal (Guardians of Time), a fictional organization in the Guardians of Time novel trilogy
 Tribunal Records, an American record label
 The Tribunal (professional wrestling), a 2013–2016 professional wrestling tag-team
 The Elder Scrolls III: Tribunal, an expansion to the video game The Elder Scrolls III: Morrowind

See also